Gianluca Piola Minozzo (born 13 February 2001), commonly known as Mancha, is a Brazilian footballer who plays as a left back for Chapecoense.

Club career
Mancha was born in Concórdia, Santa Catarina, and joined Chapecoense's youth setup at the age of 12. On 22 February 2021, shortly after being promoted to the first team, he renewed his contract until December 2023.

Mancha made his senior debut on 11 March 2021, starting in a 2–1 Campeonato Catarinense home win against Avaí. His Série A debut occurred on 17 June, as he started in a 1–1 away draw against São Paulo.

Career statistics

References

External links
Chapecoense profile 

2001 births
Living people
Sportspeople from Santa Catarina (state)
Brazilian footballers
Association football defenders
Campeonato Brasileiro Série A players
Associação Chapecoense de Futebol players